ROY was the TSE and ICAO code for Royal Aviation

ROY may also refer to:

Red-orange-yellow, a common name for chemical compound 5-Methyl-2-((2-nitrophenyl)amino)-3-thiophenecarbonitrile
Rookie of the Year (award), an award for athletes in their debut season with a sports league

See also
ROI (disambiguation)
Roy (disambiguation)